Vladimir von Notbek (Russian, Владимир Владимирович Нотбек, July 9, 1865 – 1921) was an Imperial Russian army commander. After the October Revolution of 1917, he opposed the Bolsheviks. He died in what is now Ulan-Ude in the Republic of Buryatia.

References

External links
 Биография Нотбека В. В. на сайте «Хронос»
 Восточный фронт армии адмирала А. В. Колчака

1865 births
1921 deaths
Russian military personnel of World War I
People of the Russian Civil War